La Capitale is a Belgian daily regional newspaper, specializing in the region around Brussels and published in French. It is part of the Sud Presse group. The paper is published by Rossel & CIE S.A.  and is based in Brussels.

References

External links

French-language newspapers published in Belgium
Newspapers published in Brussels
Publications with year of establishment missing